Russborough House is a stately house near the Blessington Lakes in County Wicklow, Republic of Ireland. Located between the towns of Blessington and Ballymore Eustace, it is an outstanding example of Palladian architecture, designed by Richard Cassels (also commonly known as Richard Castle) for Joseph Leeson, 1st Earl of Milltown and built between 1741 and 1755. The interior contains fine ornate plasterwork on the ceilings by the Lafranchini brothers, who also collaborated with Castle on Carton House. Russborough contains an important private collection of European fine and decorative arts, including furniture, silver, porcelain and paintings.

Russborough is open to visitors and is located on a  estate, with many of the original 18th-century features still in place including the Walled Garden, the ice-house, the lime kiln and the serpentine lakes. There is a restaurant, shop and  maze.

History

The Leeson family originated in Northamptonshire and had moved to Ireland in the second half of the 17th century. A sizeable fortune made in brewing and property development in Dublin passed down to Joseph Leeson, who bought land at what was then Russelltown. He became an MP and was made Earl of Milltown in 1763.

Russborough house was designed for Joseph Leeson by Richard Castle and built between 1741 and 1755. While the house was being built Joseph embarked on two Grand Tours to acquire a suitably impressive collection of paintings, sculpture and furnishings to adorn his new home. Back at the Russborough, Ireland's and Europe's finest artisans and craftspeople were appointed by Castle to create a truly lavish interior. It remained in the possession of the Earls of Milltown until the sixth earl. On the death of his widow in 1914 it passed to a nephew, Edmund Turton, who rarely stayed there. On Turton's death in 1929, his widow sold the house to Captain Denis Bowes Daly in 1931. Sir Alfred Beit bought Russborough in 1952 from Captain Daly to house his art collection and in 1976 established the Alfred Beit Foundation, a registered charity, to manage the property. Described as Ireland's most beautiful Georgian house, the foundation opened the historic mansion and its collections to the Irish public in 1978. Beit died in 1994 and Lady Beit remained in residence until her own death in 2005.

Architecture
Russborough is a classical Palladian villa made up of a central block containing the principal rooms and two wings housing the servants and stable blocks to the east and west. Castle enhanced his core design with a wealth of features. The Greek orders are observed in the Doric columns of the colonnades and the Corinthian columns that flank the main entrance, supporting a fused portico enriched with swags of flowers. At the bottom of the flight of granite steps the visitor is greeted by a pair of heraldic lions, bearers of the Leeson arms. Russborough's central block contains seven principal rooms on the ground floor with the largest, the Entrance Hall at centre of the south front, and the main reception room, the Saloon placed directly to its north. The other five rooms, originally comprising two Drawing Rooms, two Dining Rooms, and a Music Room complete a symmetrical arrangement. The ceilings of several rooms and the main stairhall feature elaborate stucco work attributed to the Swiss-Italian stuccodores, Paolo and Filippo Lafrancini.

Art collections
Russborough has housed two fine art collections, begun with the Milltown estate, whose collection was donated to the National Gallery of Ireland by the widow of the sixth earl, Lady Geraldine Milltown in 1902.

Sir Alfred and Clementine, Lady Beit, a cousin of the Mitford sisters, bought the house in 1952 where he housed his own family's collection, started by his uncle, Alfred Beit, comprising works by many great artists, including Goya, Vermeer, Peter Paul Rubens and Thomas Gainsborough. Sir Alfred and Lady Beit established the Alfred Beit Foundation as a registered charity in 1976 to safeguard the house and collections for future generations. In 1987, they donated seventeen of their finest paintings to the National Gallery of Ireland. Russborough opened to the public as a museum and visitor attraction in 1978. Among the Collection's treasures still in Russborough are an outstanding array of eighteenth-century French and English furniture, many important paintings from the 17th to 20th centuries, including paintings by Jean-Baptiste Oudry, Adriaen van Ostade and Claude-Joseph Vernet. Four Vernet paintings entitled 'Morning', 'Midday', 'Sunset', and 'Night' were actually painted for Russborough in the 1750s and had remained in the house for most of the last 260 years. In addition it exhibits one of the finest private collections of 18th-century silver and porcelain in Ireland, including significant pieces by Meissen and Sèvres.

Park

The Russborough demesne extends to 200 acres, with a number of walks, gardens and original 18th century features. From the start, the estate was laid out to a formal design. This is still reflected in the remnants of the extensive lawn and terraces with a shaped pond in the middle to the north of the house. Meanwhile, to the south there is a more naturalistic prospect with rolling fields, serpentine lakes and mature woodland. It remains an almost intact example of an Irish demesne from this period, with features such as the Walled Garden, the ice-house and the lime kiln.

There is a 2 km maze, craft courtyard of artisan studios and The National Bird of Prey Centre.

Fire
On 7 February 2010, a fire severely damaged the west wing and caused part of the roof to collapse. No art was damaged, being removed along with furniture to allow for restorations to the west wing. Initial examinations of the damage suggested an electrical fault from wiring in the roof may have sparked the fire.

Art robberies
Portions of the Russborough collection have been stolen four times. These include thefts in: 1974 by an IRA gang including British heiress Rose Dugdale; in 1986 by Martin Cahill (nicknamed "The General"); in 2001, and in 2002 by Martin Cahill's associate Martin Foley. Two paintings, Gainsborough's Madame Bacelli and Vermeer's Lady writing a Letter with her Maid, the latter probably the most valuable painting of the collection, were stolen twice across the thefts, although each was subsequently recovered (the latter in 1993, the same year as the recovery of Goya's Portrait of Dona Antonia Zarate).

In popular culture
Russborough House was used as a setting in 2011 film Haywire, and the 2016 film Love & Friendship.

The house was featured in Travel Channel's Mysteries at the Castle.

See also
Poulaphouca Reservoir

Notes

Further reading

External links

Russborough House - official site
Conservation Plan - issued by the Heritage Council of Ireland

Houses in the Republic of Ireland
Country houses in Ireland
Museums in County Wicklow
Gardens in County Wicklow
Historic house museums in the Republic of Ireland
Art museums and galleries in the Republic of Ireland
Palladian architecture in Ireland
Richard Cassels buildings